Socialist-style emblems usually follow a unique style consisting of communist symbolism. Although commonly referred to as coats of arms, most are not actually traditional heraldic achievements. Many communist governments purposely diverged from heraldic tradition in order to distance themselves from the monarchies that they usually replaced, with coats of arms being seen as symbols of the monarchs.

The Soviet Union was the first state to use a socialist-style emblem, beginning at its creation in 1922. The style became more widespread after World War II, when many other communist states were established. Even a few non-socialist (or communist) states have adopted the style, for various reasons—usually because communists had helped them to gain independence or establish their republican governments. After the fall of the Soviet Union and the other communist states in Eastern Europe between 1989 and 1992, this style of state emblems was often abandoned in favour of the old heraldic practices, with many (but not all) of the new governments reinstating traditional heraldry that was previously cast aside.

Origin and history

The Soviet Union, created after the 1917 revolution, required insignia to represent itself in line with other sovereign states, such as emblems, flags and seals, but the Soviet leaders did not wish to continue the old heraldic practices which they saw as associated with the societal system the revolution sought to replace. In response to the needs and wishes, the national emblem adopted would lack the traditional heraldic elements of a shield, helm, crest and mantling, and instead be presented more plainly. This style was followed then by other socialist and communist states, which wished to also focus attention on the nation's workers and diverge from feudalism and all of its associations.

In some communist countries, the socialist style of emblems was never adopted fully. The coat of arms of Poland was only changed slightly under the communist era, retaining the traditional heraldic form. In Hungary, the "Rákosi badge", an emblem in the socialist style, was adopted following the Second World War, but after the 1956 uprising, a new emblem ("Kádár badge") was created combining communist symbolism with a heraldic shield in the colours of the Hungarian flag. Czechoslovakia became a Communist country in 1948 but retained its original coat of arms until 1961, when they were replaced with a non-traditional shield depicting the heraldic Bohemian lion without a crown and with a red star above head. Some of the states of Yugoslavia also used heraldic shields coupled with socialist imagery in their emblems, as did two republics within the USSR: the Russian Soviet Federative Socialist Republic and the Ukrainian Soviet Socialist Republic.

Characteristics

Socialist style of state emblems typically makes use of the following symbols:
 Hammer and sickle, representing respectively the workers and peasantry. In some countries, the sickle may be replaced by another traditional tool for local agriculture, most often a hoe. More rarely, a hammer may be used on its own, to represent the working classes as a whole.
 The five-pointed Red star, representing the five fingers of the worker's hand and the five continents on the earth. Often displayed with a yellow border, or a yellow five-pointed star, often on a red background 
 Wreaths of grain or other domesticated plants encircling the emblem, representing agriculture and plenty
 Interwoven ribbons in national or red colors, sometimes used for a motto
 The rising sun, representing revolution
 Modern industrial accessories such as gears and electricity pylons
 Books, representing the intelligentsia, and more generally, science and culture
 Local landscapes
 Other tools or accessories, sometimes weapons. However, the latter is more characteristic of national liberation movement symbolism than of traditional Socialist heraldic style.
Emblems following this style generally have a circular or oval shape.

Present
With the dissolution of the Eastern Bloc in Europe, most of these countries' socialist emblems have been replaced with old pre-communist symbols or by wholly new coats of arms.

The socialist style's influence is still seen in the emblems of several countries, such as the People's Republic of China. North Korea has a national emblem in pure socialist style, as do Vietnam and Laos.

During the infancy years of the Russian Federation (the successor to the Soviet Union), the country used the modified version of the emblem of the RSFSR with the inscription was changed from RSFSR to the Russian Federation (/) until the new coat of arms was adopted in 1993. The national emblem of Belarus was adopted in 1995 following a controversial referendum. It is reminiscent of that of the Byelorussian SSR and replaced the coat of arms of 1991–1995 which followed the traditional heraldic style. Tajikistan and Uzbekistan also retained components of their respective former Soviet republics' emblems.

The national emblem of North Macedonia is reminiscent of that of the Socialist Republic of Macedonia (once a constituent socialist republic of the Socialist Federal Republic of Yugoslavia), having removed the red star from it in 2009.

In Africa, the emblems of the former Portuguese colonies of Angola and Mozambique, as well as Guinea-Bissau, follow the socialist-style emblems formula.

The Republic of Serbia used the coat of arms of the Socialist Republic of Serbia until the recommended symbols by the National Assembly on 17 August 2004. The recommended usage was made into law on 11 May 2009 thus officially replacing the socialist emblem.

The unrecognised state of Transnistria has a state emblem based on a Soviet-era design, despite not being a socialist state. The pattern also applies to the self-declared Luhansk People's Republic.

Galleries
Below are galleries of historical and current national emblems. The years given are for the emblems, not for the countries.

This is not an exhaustive gallery, since they are here to illustrate the article, not to show every example. Only long-lasting emblems of independent countries are shown. They also exclude emblems which were a mix of traditional heraldry and socialist symbolism, like the present arms of São Tomé e Príncipe and of East Timor, the 1960–1990 Emblem of Czechoslovakia, or the 1974–2008 state seal of Burma, or traditionally heraldic arms of socialist countries, like those of Guyana and Cuba.

Current emblems

Non-UN member states or subnational divisions with socialist-styled emblems

Historical emblems

Republics of the Soviet Union

Republics of Yugoslavia

Notes

References

Citations

Sources 

 Slater, Stephen (2002). The complete book of Heraldry. London.

Bibliography
 Arvidsson, Stefan (2017). Style and Mythology of Socialism: Socialist Idealism, 1871–1914. Routledge
 Gorman, John (1985). Images of Labour: Selected Memorabilia from the National Museum of Labour History. London: Scorpion Publications.
 Gorman, John (1986). Banner bright: An Illustrated History of Trade Union Banners. Buckhurst Hill, Essex: Scorpion Publications.

External links 
 Blog: Heart in a Heartless World

Coats of arms of communist states
Marxism–Leninism
Heraldry
Symbols of communism
Socialist symbols
History of socialism
1922 introductions